August Franz Essen (1720–1792) was a Saxonian diplomat. He was Saxonian representative to Poland, residing in Gdańsk (Danzig) from 1761 to 1764, and then in Warsaw.

German diplomats
1720 births
1792 deaths